KF Këlcyra is an Albanian football club founded in 1981 and based in the small town of Këlcyrë. KF Këlcyra is currently competing in the Kategoria e Tretë.

Achievements
 Albanian Second Division Title – 1 time
 Albanian Third Division Title – 1999/2000

Current squad

External links
Second Division Standings and Stats

Football clubs in Albania
Association football clubs established in 1981
1981 establishments in Albania
Këlcyrë
Albanian Third Division clubs
Kategoria e Dytë clubs